Alles is Liefde is a 2007 Dutch romantic comedy film directed by Joram Lürsen, and starring Carice van Houten, Paul de Leeuw, Wendy van Dijk, and Daan Schuurmans.

Plot

The actor who annually plays Sinterklaas dies just before the arrival of the television crew. A mysterious new Sinterklaas named Jan (Michiel Romeyn) replaces him. Shortly after his public appearance, he rescues a child who fell into a canal, but runs away when people realize what happened and begin crowding around. He is found by the production assistant of the television show next day, and agrees to appear in television shows, when he is informed that playing Sinterklaas is a paying job. He becomes quite popular on television because of his alternative style.

Klaasje (Wendy van Dijk) has left her husband Dennis (Peter Paul Muller), because he cheated on her with a young and attractive elementary school teacher (Chantal Janzen). Dennis wants her back, but his chances seem to plummet when she has a fling with a 16-year-old boy (Valerio Zeno), whom she meets at her father's funeral (her father was the previous "Sinterklaas" actor).

Klaasje's best friend Simone (Anneke Blok), the mother of the girl rescued by Sinterklaas, is the linchpin in her family. Her husband Ted (Thomas Acda) often feels redundant. He loses his job, but he is afraid to tell his domineering wife.

Swimming instructor Victor (Paul de Leeuw) looks forward to marrying his love Kees (Daan Schuurmans), an undertaker. But Kees has doubts and fears about committed life. During the marriage ceremony, he walks away without saying ‘yes’.

Victor's sister Kiki (Carice van Houten), a saleswoman at the jewellery section of De Bijenkorf, has always dreamt of a Prince Charming. During the arrival of Sinterklaas, Kiki almost runs into Crown Prince Valentine (Jeroen Spitzenberger), while driving a horse carriage. Kiki is dressed as a campaign gift and the prince takes her in his arms as she tries to get down from the carriage. Prince Valentine falls in love with her. Next morning he visits De Bijenkorf to see Kiki. But Kiki desists from seeing him, and rejects him on the grounds that he will not take her seriously. To still come into contact with her, Prince Valentine dresses as Black Peter, does antics at De Bijenkorf for work. In the evening, he (dressed as Black Pieter) offers to drop her home and ends up having a wild night with her. The next morning, however, he sneaks away through the window without saying goodbye to Kiki. Kiki follows him to his hotel and confronts him. It turns out that Kiki knew all along that Prince Valentine was playing Black Pieter but just wanted to see how far he would go for her. They end up kissing each other.

On the night of Sinterklaas Eve, Jan again runs away before his appearance in the show. He is spotted by Ted who recognizes him to be his child's rescuer. Ted invites Jan, dressed as Sinterklaas, to his house for a beer. The neighborhood children gradually flock to his house, as word spreads of Jan's presence. The television crew also eventually comes there. During his TV interview, he speaks candidly about his life and his regrets. He also tells that the name of his son is Kees and that he abandoned his family when his son was three years old. The 5 December Special TV show comes to an end and Sinterklaas is seen walking out onto the snowy street. As he walks and looks around, all the couples are shown one by one to have found out what to do with their lives. Having found his father on the television show, Kees drives with Victor to meet him. They come across him in the middle of the road as they were driving. The movie ends with Jan, dressed as Sinterklaas, embracing Kees.

Background

The story is inspired by the film Love Actually (2003). The budget of Alles is Liefde was € 4 million.

Cast

Carice van Houten as Kiki Jollema
Paul de Leeuw as Victor Jollema
Michiel Romeyn as Sinterklaas Jan
Wendy van Dijk as Klaasje van Ophorst
Thomas Acda as Ted Coelman
Daan Schuurmans as Kees Tromp
Lies Visschedijk as Alicia
Anneke Blok as Simone Coelman
Peter Paul Muller as Dennis
Chantal Janzen as Sarah
Jeroen Spitzenberger as Prince Valentijn
Marc-Marie Huijbregts as Rudolf
Valerio Zeno as Daniël

Box office

Alles is Liefde had a box office take of €9.1 million in 2007.

In 2007, it was the most viewed Dutch film in cinemas, and over all the third most viewed film in Dutch cinemas, coming after Harry Potter and the Order of the Phoenix and Pirates of the Caribbean: At World's End.

Alles is Liefde is the most visited Dutch romantic comedy film ever, and is in the top 20 of most visited Dutch films of all time.

References

External links
  
 

2007 romantic comedy films
2007 films
2000s Dutch-language films
Dutch romantic comedy films
Sinterklaas films
Films shot in Amsterdam
Films shot in the Netherlands
Films set in Amsterdam
Films set in the Netherlands